, sometimes known as Japanology in Europe, is a sub-field of area studies or East Asian studies involved in social sciences and humanities research on Japan. It incorporates fields such as the study of Japanese language, culture, history, literature, art, music and science. Its roots may be traced back to the Dutch at Dejima, Nagasaki in the Edo period. The foundation of the Asiatic Society of Japan at Yokohama in 1872 by men such as Ernest Satow and Frederick Victor Dickins was an important event in the development of Japanese studies as an academic discipline.

Japanese studies organizations and publications
In the United States, the Society for Japanese Studies has published the Journal of Japanese Studies (JJS) since 1974. This is a biannual academic journal dealing with research on Japan in the United States. 
JJS is supported by grants from the Japan Foundation, Georgetown University, and the University of Washington in addition to endowments from the Kyocera Corporation and the National Endowment for the Humanities.

The British Association for Japanese Studies (BAJS), founded in 1974, is an association primarily sponsored by Toshiba and the Japan Foundation. The BAJS publishes an academic journal called Japan Forum.

In Europe, the European Association for Japanese Studies (EAJS) is also funded by Toshiba and the Japan Foundation. It has held triennial conferences around Europe since 1973. Other academic journals dealing with Japanese studies include Monumenta Nipponica, a biannual English-language journal affiliated with Sophia University in Tokyo, and Social Science Japan Journal, published by Oxford University Press.

Scholarship on Japan is also within the purview of many organizations and publications dealing with the more general field of East Asian studies, such as the Association for Asian Studies or the Duke University publication Positions: Asia Critique.

The International Research Center for Japanese Studies (Nichibunken), maintains an online database of institutions involved in Japanese studies research worldwide, including information on 1,640 institutions of Japanese studies. The database indicates that the country with the most institutions of Japanese studies outside the United States and Japan is China (121), while other countries containing a significant number of institutions include South Korea (85), England (69), Germany (64), Canada (61), Australia (54), and France (54).

Notable Japanologists
 Boris Akunin
 Ruth Benedict
 Basil Hall Chamberlain
 Serge Elisséeff
 Carol Gluck
 William Elliot Griffis
 Conrad Totman
 Lafcadio Hearn
 Algernon Freeman-Mitford, 1st Baron Redesdale also known as A. B. Mitford and Lord Redesdale.
 Donald Keene
 Fosco Maraini
 Edwin O. Reischauer
 Donald Richie
 Ernest Mason Satow
 Edward Seidensticker
 Francis Xavier
 Judit Hidasi
 Steponas Kairys

Scholarly journals
 Bulletin of the National Museum of Japanese History, In Japanese
 East Asian History
 Japan Forum
 Japanese Studies
 Japanese Journal of Religious Studies
 Journal of Japanese Studies
 Monumenta Nipponica, Japanese studies, in English
 Sino-Japanese Studies 
 Social Science Japan Journal

See also 
 East Asian studies
 International Research Center for Japanese Studies
 Japan Academy
 Japanophilia 
 List of Japanologists
 Oriental studies
 Otaku
 Weeaboo

References

External links 

 Electronic journal of contemporary Japanese studies
 European Association for Japanese Studies
 Images of Japan in Non-Japanese Sources

Library guides